Narva culture or eastern Baltic was a European Neolithic archaeological culture found in present-day Estonia, Latvia, Lithuania, Kaliningrad Oblast (former East Prussia), and adjacent portions of Poland, Belarus and Russia. A successor of the Mesolithic Kunda culture, Narva culture continued up to the start of the Bronze Age. The technology was that of hunter-gatherers. The culture was named after the Narva River in Estonia.

Technology and artifacts

The people of the Narva culture had little access to flint; therefore, they were forced to trade and conserve their flint resources. For example, there were very few flint arrowheads and flint was often reused. The Narva culture relied on local materials (bone, horn, schist). As evidence of trade, researchers found pieces of pink flint from Valdai Hills and plenty of typical Narva pottery in the territory of the Neman culture while no objects from the Neman culture were found in Narva. Heavy use of bones and horns is one of the main characteristics of the Narva culture. The bone tools, continued from the predecessor Kunda culture, provide the best evidence of continuity of the Narva culture throughout the Neolithic period. The people were buried on their backs with few grave goods. The Narva culture also used and traded amber; a few hundred items were found in Juodkrantė. One of the most famous artifacts is a ceremonial cane carved of horn as a head of female elk found in Šventoji.

The people were primarily fishers, hunters, and gatherers. They slowly began adopting husbandry in the middle Neolithic. They were not nomadic and lived in same settlements for long periods as evidenced by abundant pottery, middens, and structures built in lakes and rivers to help fishing. The pottery shared similarities with the Comb Ceramic culture, but had specific characteristics. One of the most persistent features was mixing clay with other organic matter, most often crushed snail shells. The vessels were wide and large; the height and the width were often the same. The bottoms were pointed or rounded, and only the latest examples have narrow flat bottoms. From mid-Neolithic, Narva pottery was influenced and eventually disappeared into the Corded Ware culture.

History of research
For a long time archaeologists believed that the first inhabitants of the region were Finnic, who were pushed north by people of the Corded Ware culture. In 1931, Latvian archaeologist  was the first to note that artifacts found near the Zebrus Lake in Latvia were different and possibly belonged to a separate archaeological culture. In early 1950s settlements on the Narva River were excavated.  and  grouped the findings with similar artifacts from eastern Baltic region and described the Narva culture.

At first, it was believed that Narva culture ended with the appearance of the Corded Ware culture. However, newer research extended it up to the Bronze Age. As Narva culture spanned several millennia and encompassed a large territory, archaeologists attempted to subdivide the culture into regions or periods. For example, in Lithuania two regions are distinguished: southern (under influence of the Neman culture) and western (with major settlements found in Šventoji). There is an academic debate what ethnicity the Narva culture represented: speakers of Finno-Ugric languages or other Europids, preceding the arrival of the Indo-Europeans. It is also unclear how the Narva culture fits with the arrival of the Indo-Europeans (Corded Ware and Globular Amphora cultures) and the formation of the Baltic tribes.

Genetics
Mathieson (2015) analyzed a large number of individuals buried at the Zvejnieki burial ground, most of whom were affiliated with the Kunda culture and the succeeding Narva culture. The mtDNA extracted belonged exclusively to haplotypes of U5, U4 and U2. With regards to Y-DNA, the vast majority of samples belonged to R1b1a1a haplotypes and I2a1 haplotypes. The results affirmed that the Kunda and Narva cultures were about 70% WHG and 30% EHG. The nearby contemporary Pit–Comb Ware culture was on the contrary found to be about 65% EHG. And individual from the Corded Ware culture, which would eventually succeed the Narva culture, was found to have genetic relations with the Yamnaya culture.

Jones et al. (2017) examined the remains of a male of the Narva culture buried c. 5780-5690 BC. He was found to be a carrier of the paternal haplogroup R1b1b and the maternal haplogroup U2e1. People of the Narva culture and preceding Kunda culture were determined to have closer genetic affinity with Western Hunter-Gatherers (WHGs) than Eastern Hunter-Gatherers (EHGs).

Saag et al. (2017) determined haplogroup U5a2d in a Narva male.

Mittnik et al. (2018) analyzed 24 Narva individuals. Of the four samples of Y-DNA extracted, one belonged to I2a1a2a1a, one belonged to I2a1b, one belonged to I, and one belonged to R1. Of the ten samples of mtDNA extracted, eight belonged to U5 haplotypes, one belonged to U4a1, and one belonged to H11. U5 haplotypes were common among Western Hunter-Gatherers (WHGs) and Scandinavian Hunter-Gatherers (SHGs). Genetic influence from Eastern Hunter-Gatherers (EHGs) was also detected.

See also
 Pitted Ware culture
 Rzucewo culture
 Dnieper-Donets culture

References

Sources

External links
Overview of Neolithic sites on Narva River in Estonia

Archaeological cultures of Eastern Europe
Mesolithic cultures of Europe
Archaeological cultures in Estonia
Archaeological cultures in Latvia
Archaeological cultures in Lithuania
Archaeological cultures in Poland
Archaeological cultures in Russia
Stone Age Latvia
6th-millennium BC establishments